The Ireland national under-20 rugby team was formed in 2006, having previously been known as the under-21 team. They have won the Grand Slam four times and the Six Nations Championship five times: 2007, 2010, 2019, 2022 and 2023.

Current squad
Head coach Richie Murphy named his 32–man squad for the 2023 Six Nations Under 20s Championship on 18 January. All clubs are Irish unless otherwise indicated.

Coaching and management

Overall record

Correct as of 19 March 2023

Honours

Six Nations Under 20s Championship:
Winner (5): 2007, 2010, 2019, 2022, 2023
Grand Slam:
Winner (4): 2007, 2019, 2022, 2023
 Triple Crown:
 Winner (6): 2007, 2010, 2019, 2020, 2022, 2023

World Rugby Under 20 Championship:
Runner Up (1): 2016

See also
Ireland national rugby union team
Ireland Wolfhounds
Emerging Ireland
Ireland national schoolboy rugby union team
Six Nations Under 20s Championship
World Rugby Under 20 Championship

References

External links
Ireland U-20 Squad from official IRFU site

Ireland national rugby union team
European national under-20 rugby union teams